BX Andromedae (BX And) is an eclipsing binary star in the constellation Andromeda. Its maximum apparent visual magnitude is 8.87. Within a cycle of approximately 14.6 hours, the brightness drops down to a magnitude of 9.53 during the main eclipse, and to a magnitude of 9.12 during the secondary one. It is classified as a Beta Lyrae variable.

Variability
BX Andromedae, like all Beta Lyrae variables, shows a primary and a secondary minimum when, respectively, the most luminous and the less luminous component of the pair is eclipsed by the other. The brightness however changes smoothly, so there is no onset and an end time for the eclipses. This cycle repeats approximately every 14.6 hours.

System
The two stars in the system are orbiting so close to each other that they retain an ellipsoidal shape. The spectrum of the two stars has not been separated yet; as a whole, the system has a spectral type F2V. The physical parameters of the stars (like mass, radius, and temperature) can be inferred from the light curve.

BX Andromedae, however, may be a quadruple system. This system shows slight orbital period variations that could be induced by a third faint body in the system with an orbital period of 62 years. There is also a visual companion star TYC 2833-53-1 of 10.85 magnitude only 20 arcseconds away with a common proper motion and a distance (measured with parallax) compatible with the one of BX Andromedae, and has an estimated mass of 1.04 .

References

Andromeda (constellation)
Andromedae, BX
J02090342+4047392
Beta Lyrae variables
BD+40 442
010027
013078